Forest Lawn Memorial Park is a cemetery in Burnaby, British Columbia in Canada. The burial park was founded in 1936 and the funeral home was established in 1965. The cemetery contains the war graves of 37 Commonwealth service personnel of World War II.

Notable interments
 William Aberhart, Premier of Alberta from 1935 to 1943
 Doug Grimston, president of the Canadian Amateur Hockey Association
 Frederick Hume, politician
 Roy Jokanovich, CFL player
 Amby Moran, hockey player
 Michael James O'Rourke, Irish-born Canadian Victoria Cross recipient.
 Claude C. Robinson, ice hockey executive and inductee of the Hockey Hall of Fame
 Lydia Shum, Hong Kong actress who died in 2008. Shum's parents are also buried close to her grave site.
 Ronald Tabak, rock singer
 Charles William Train, British Victoria Cross recipient

References

External links
 Forest Lawn Memorial Burial Park and Funeral Home 
 

Cemeteries in British Columbia
Tourist attractions in Burnaby
1936 establishments in British Columbia